"Undercover Martyn" is the third single by the Northern Irish indie rock band Two Door Cinema Club. The single was released on 18 February 2010 by the French label Kitsuné Music and Co-operative Music. The song has also been featured on the soundtrack of the PlayStation 3 game Gran Turismo 5 and it also became popular in the early 2020s due to being used in "Ketsu Drum" internet meme.

Track listing

CD/Digital download

7" vinyl

Charts

Certifications

References

External links
 
 

Kitsuné singles
2010 singles
Two Door Cinema Club songs
2009 songs